Pogolo may refer to:
Pogolo people
Pogolo language